"Carol of the Bells" is a popular Christmas carol which is based on the Ukrainian song called "Shchedryk" (Ukrainian: Щедрик). The "Carol of the Bells" uses the original melody from "Shchedryk," written by the Ukrainian composer Mykola Leontovych in 1914. 

Ukrainian "Shchedryk" was adapted as an English Christmas carol, "Carol of the Bells", by Peter J. Wilhousky of NBC Radio, following a performance of the original song by the Ukrainian National Chorus at Carnegie Hall on October 5, 1922.  Peter J. Wilhousky, American composer, music educator, and choral conductor of Ukrainian descent, wrote the lyrics in English. 

The Ukrainian music is in the public domain; Wilhousky's lyrics, however, are under copyright owned by Carl Fischer Music. 

The music is based on a four-note ostinato and is in  time signature, with the B-flat bell pealing in  time. The carol is metrically bistable, and a listener can focus on either measure or switch between them. It has been adapted for many genres, including: classical, metal, jazz, country music, rock, trap, and pop. The piece also features in films, television shows, and parodies.

Background

Origins

The conductor of the Ukrainian Republic Capella, Oleksander Koshyts (also spelled Alexander Koshetz) commissioned Leontovych to create the song based on traditional Ukrainian folk chants, and the resulting new work for choir, "Shchedryk", was based on four notes Leontovych found in an anthology.

The original folk story related in the song was associated with the coming New Year, which, in pre-Christian Ukraine, was celebrated with the coming of spring in April. The original Ukrainian title translates to "the generous one" or is perhaps derived from the Ukrainian word for bountiful, and tells a tale of a swallow flying into a household to proclaim the bountiful year that the family will have.

With the introduction of Christianity to Ukraine and the adoption of the Julian calendar, the celebration of the New Year was moved from April to January, and the holiday with which the chant was originally associated became Malanka, the eve of the Julian New Year (the night of January 13–14 in the Gregorian calendar).

The song was first performed by students at Kyiv University in December 1916, but the song lost popularity in Ukraine shortly after the Soviet Union took hold. It was introduced to Western audiences by the Ukrainian National Chorus during its 1919 concert tour of Europe and America, where it premiered in the United States on October 5, 1922, to a sold-out audience at Carnegie Hall. The original work was intended to be sung a cappella by mixed four-voice choir.

Two other settings of the composition were also created by Leontovych: One for women's choir (unaccompanied) and another for children's choir with piano accompaniment. These are rarely performed or recorded.

English lyric versions
Wilhousky rearranged the melody for orchestra with new lyrics for NBC radio network's symphony orchestra, centered around the theme of bells because the melody reminded him of hand bells, which begins "Hark! How the bells". It was first aired during the Great Depression, and Wilhousky copyrighted the new lyrics in 1936 and also published the song, despite the song having been published almost two decades earlier in the Ukrainian National Republic. Its initial popularity stemmed largely from Wilhousky's ability to reach a wide audience as his role as arranger for the NBC Symphony Orchestra. It is now strongly associated with Christmas because of its new lyrics, which reference bells, caroling, and the line "merry, merry, merry, merry Christmas".

"Ring, Christmas Bells", an English-language variant featuring nativity-based lyrics, was written by Minna Louise Hohman in 1947. Two other versions exist by anonymous writers: one from 1957 titled "Come Dance and Sing" and one from 1972 that begins "Hark to the bells".

American recordings by various artists began to surface on the radio in the 1940s. The song gained further popularity when an instrumental was featured in television advertisements for Andre champagne in the 1970s. "Carol of the Bells" has been recorded into over 150 versions and re-arrangements for varying vocal and instrumental compositions.

Notable recordings

In popular culture

 The song appears in the 1990 film Home Alone as arranged by John Williams. In 2018, this version charted at No. 20 on the Swedish Heatseeker chart.
 The Muppets' 2009 parody of the song climaxes with a large bell (set up by Animal) falling on the increasingly frenetic Beaker, which quickly became a viral video that Christmas season.

Charts

Pentatonix version

Mantikor version

See also
 List of Christmas carols

References

Ukrainian music
New Year songs
Ukrainian songs
Ukrainian folk music
Christmas carols
Compositions by Mykola Leontovych